Alexander Tukhachevsky (1793-1831) was a Russian military officer and a Colonel of Imperial Russian Army. A commanding officer of the (14th) Olonets Infantry Regiment, he took part in the Polish-Russian War of 1830 and was killed in the battle of Warsaw (1831). Coincidentally, his great-grandson Mikhail Tukhachevsky was defeated at the gates of Warsaw almost a century later.

References

1793 births
1831 deaths
Imperial Russian Army personnel
Russian nobility
Russian people of the November Uprising
Military personnel of the Russian Empire killed in action